The Dennis Miller Show was a conservative American comedy and talk radio show hosted by comedian Dennis Miller on Westwood One. The show ran from 2007 until 2015.

Show airtime and format 
The Dennis Miller Show aired at different times at various locations with Miller broadcasting out of his home in the Santa Barbara, California area and with the rest of the show being broadcast from Culver City, California.

Website 
The radio show also featured a website with additional material for paid subscribers.  The additional website material included a message board, merchandise, and video clips of Dennis answering viewers questions in segment called the "Bathrobe Sessions".

Music
The Dennis Miller Show used music as a significant part of the show.  Each Wednesday featured music from a different artist or musical theme, billed as “Bumper Music Wednesday.”  Many of the selections were of a classic rock format.

Frequent bumper music included the ending of "Eclipse" by Pink Floyd, a middle section of "Radar Love" by Golden Earring, and a piano section of "New Year's Day" by U2.

Notable sayings and characters
 Chimp doctor
 Kwok Brothers commercials
 Touching Indians—taking phones called, saying from Lost in America
 Slappy and Comandante—fake names for producer Christian and Dennis, aping Morning zoo radio personalities
 "Shalom Aloha"—"and an Aloha Shalom to you"
 "Skeetuh?"—"Skeetuh good."
 Bit surfin'—"Two Tags on Every Bit!" (Bad joke built off a previous good joke.)
 "Starship"—cue to play We Built This City
 "Cheng Huan lived alone in a room on Formosa Street above the Blue Lantern, and he sat at his window and in his poor, listening heart..." (Audio clip from Out of Africa played when Dennis rambled too much on an obscure humor attempt.)
 Siamnesia Torncurtain, the cat shouter—"Hey, get off that!"
 The love theme from The Delta Force, special music
 Dennis' former dog—Chicken Leg Desmond, Welfare Cheat
 Woodsy Monckton, the Procrastinative Survivalist
 Cass Stokeley, consumptive bouncer
 The Burglar Owl—"Who?  Me?"

Notable political guests
 George W. Bush, former President of the United States
 Dick Cheney, former Vice President of the United States
 Henry Kissinger, former U.S. Secretary of State
 Donald Rumsfeld, former U.S. Secretary of Defense
 Rudy Giuliani, former Mayor of New York City
 Boris Johnson, Mayor of London
 Michael Chertoff, U.S. Secretary of Homeland Security
 John McCain, U.S. senator and former presidential candidate
 Mitt Romney, former presidential candidate and Massachusetts governor
 Jack Kemp, former vice presidential candidate, HUD Secretary, and congressman
 Sarah Palin, former vice presidential candidate and Alaska governor
 Paul Ryan, congressman and former vice presidential candidate
 Ted Sorensen, special counsel and speechwriter for John F. Kennedy
 Robert F. Kennedy, Jr., environmental activist and son of Robert F. Kennedy

Frequent guests
 Debra Saunders, conservative columnist from San Francisco 
 Victor Davis Hanson, conservative historian and author from California
 John Bolton, former UN ambassador (played on to the song "I Am the Walrus" due to his walrus moustache) 
 David Dreier, former California congressman (a weekly guest during the first few years)
 Jillian Melchior, National Review columnist
 Charles Krauthammer, conservative columnist, author, and television commentator
 Jerome Corsi, conservative writer and conspiracy theorist (played on to the theme music from Lost in Space) 
 Mike Murphy, Republican Party political consultant (played on to the theme music from The Dam Busters) 
 Bill Kristol, editor of the Weekly Standard and television commentator
 Thaddeus McCotter, former Michigan congressman and presidential candidate
 Mark Steyn, conservative author and music critic
 Peter Noone, singer from Herman's Hermits and Santa Barbara neighbor
 Orson Bean, actor, comedian, and raconteur
 Zuhdi Jasser, Muslim critic of extreme Islamism
 Dana Carvey, comedian and impressionist
 Ted Nugent, rock musician and hunting-rights advocate
 Adam Sandler, comedian, actor, and film-maker
 Norm Macdonald, comedian, actor and writer
 Jesse Lee Peterson, founder of The Brotherhood Organization of a New Destiny
 Kyndra Rotunda, former officer in the U.S. Army JAG Corps
 Thomas Sowell, economist, author, and photographer
 Jake Tapper, CNN and ABC News correspondent (nicknamed by Dennis as Tap-Tap the Chiseler)
 Bob Massi, Fox News legal analyst (nicknamed by Dennis as Classy Bobby Massi)

Program staff 
 Christian Bladt, producer and sidekick during later years.
 David S. Weiss, comedian and sidekick from March 2007 until February 2010. 
 The rest of the staff were given nicknames with the sound board operators named Liev and Saberhagen and the call screeners and additional staff named Coltrane, Munga, and Agent Starling.

Frequent substitute hosts
 Larry O'Connor, a website writer and former theatre manager
 Andrew Breitbart, a conservative website publisher and commentator
 Nick DiPaolo, a stand-up comedian
 Royal F. Oakes, a Los Angeles-area lawyer and legal analyst
 Douglas Urbanski, a film producer and raconteur
 Christian Bladt, the show’s producer
 Other mostly one-time substitute hosts included Norm Macdonald, Jon Lovitz, Allen Covert, Scott Baio, Clint Howard, Larry Miller, Howie Carr, Greg Gutfeld, Thaddeus McCotter, and Robert Wuhl.

Related Projects 
 The Dennis Miller Option, a twice-weekly 2018 podcast hosted by Dennis Miller and Christian Bladt
 Red Circle Sports with Dennis Miller, a 2018 sports podcast hosted by Dennis Miller
 The P’Od podcast, a weekly hour-long 2015 podcast hosted by Dennis Miller and Adam Carolla
 The O'Reilly Factor, weekly Dennis Miller comedy segments every Wednesday
 The Bladt Cast, a podcast by show producer Christian Bladt and other former staff

See also
 Dennis Miller

References

External links
 

Conservative talk radio
American talk radio programs